Artem Manko (born 6 November 1998) is a Ukrainian wheelchair fencer who competes in épée, foil and sabre. He won the silver medal in the men's sabre A event at the 2020 Summer Paralympics held in Tokyo, Japan.

References 

Living people
1998 births
Place of birth missing (living people)
Ukrainian male épée fencers
Ukrainian male sabre fencers
Wheelchair fencers at the 2020 Summer Paralympics
Medalists at the 2020 Summer Paralympics
Paralympic silver medalists for Ukraine
Paralympic medalists in wheelchair fencing
Paralympic wheelchair fencers of Ukraine
Ukrainian male foil fencers
21st-century Ukrainian people